Yanzi's Tomb is the tomb of Yan Yan, a prominent disciple of Confucius. He is honorifically known as Yanzi (Master Yan). The tomb is located on Yushan, Changshu, Jiangsu Province, China. Yanzi was a native of Changshu. As a young man he went to the State of Lu where he studied under Confucius. Yanzi, hard-working and intelligent, excelled in literature. After finishing his studies, he returned to the south and became known as "Master of the South".

Yanzi's Tomb was established in the early Western Han Dynasty for the first time. The tomb was enhanced over many generations. The entrance of the tomb faces North Gate Street. The ramp extends to the hillside which reaches . Chinese culture suggests that placing a tomb on a hillside increases its Feng Shui. There are three arches all with plaques and each arch has a pair of couplets. The ramp has three pavilions. Two tombstones one of Qing Dynasty and another of Ming Dynasty commemorate the tomb.

Yanzi's Tomb was given protection as a provincial cultural treasure in October 1956.

References

Tombs in China
Buildings and structures in Suzhou
Changshu